Karl Höfer (10 April 1925 – 30 November 1990) was an Austrian footballer. He played in one match for the Austria national football team in 1959.

References

External links
 

1925 births
1990 deaths
Austrian footballers
Austria international footballers
Place of birth missing
Association footballers not categorized by position